Joaquim Marcos Cunga Balanga (born 13 March 1998), commonly known as Quinito, is an Angolan footballer who currently plays as a defender.

At the youth level he played in the 2016 COSAFA U-20 Cup.

Career statistics

Club

Notes

International

References

1998 births
Living people
Angolan footballers
Angola international footballers
Association football defenders
G.D. Interclube players
Angola under-20 international footballers
Angola A' international footballers
2022 African Nations Championship players